Punta Pescadero Airstrip  is a private-use airstrip located in Punta Pescadero, 9 miles North of Los Barriles, Municipality of Los Cabos, Baja California Sur, Mexico. This airport is privately owned by "Punta Pescadero Hotel", and is used solely for general aviation purposes.

External links
Punta Pescadero Airstrip Info
PPC at Kls2.

Airports in Baja California Sur
Los Cabos Municipality (Baja California Sur)